The top music artists in Japan include Japanese artists with claims of 15 million or more record sales or with over 2 million subscribers. Japan is the largest physical music market in the world and the second largest overall behind the United States, and the biggest in Asia, according to International Federation of the Phonographic Industry.

Sources that provide the sales an artist or record company claim via press release, rather than certified or reported by reliable third parties such as Oricon, are denoted by a "†".

Oricon Charts
Oricon provides accumulated physical sales of all entries on its singles and albums charts (started in 1968 and 1970, respectively). Note that Oricon does not count sales of the records that did not enter or fell off of the charts, unlike Nielsen SoundScan. Therefore, it generally shows fewer numbers than reported sales via record labels, and may not reflect the real sales obtained by these artists. In addition, it excludes recording artists like Michiya Mihashi, Hibari Misora, Yujiro Ishihara, and Hachiro Kasuga who had garnered most of commercial success before Oricon was established in the late 1960s. The reported numbers like Mihashi's 100 million and Misora's 68 million records, are highly doubtful and cannot be confirmed by Oricon and RIAJ.

The best-selling artist according to Oricon are B'z (more than 82 million), who is also the best-selling artist by a number of albums sold (46.5 million). The best-selling artists by number of singles sold are AKB48 (50.8 million), B'z (35.8 million) in second place, Mr. Children (28.45 million) in third place, and Southern All Stars (25.179 million) in fourth place. Ayumi Hamasaki holds the record for being the best selling solo artist and being the only solo artist to sell more than 60 million in total.

The list excludes sales of albums or singles recorded by artists in collaboration with others as part of a singular artist or group's total.

Artists by sales

60 million or more records

30 million to 49 million records

20 million to 29 million records

10 million to 19 million records

Best-selling Western acts 

The long-standing second world's biggest music market have seen record sales dominated by their local music acts.   

A selected group of Western acts have achieved certified units of over 4 million since Japan's music certification system inception by RIAJ in 1989. Various of them debuted before that tracking system, selling millions of their catalogue along with thousand of copies for an individual title alone; ranging from Madonna to Michael Jackson according to Oricon's chart book figures. By other estimates, Western acts like the 1970s band, The Nolans have claimed sales of 12 million in the country during their heydays.

Note: *Dion's "international" debut is considered to be dated in 1990, with her first English-recording album. It is the decade when she also entered the Japanese charts.

Best-selling artist sales by year

Most subscribed 
The following table is a list of artists with over 2 million subscribers. It is updated as of February 27, 2023.

Notes

See also
 List of best-selling singles in Japan
 List of best-selling albums in Japan

References

Further reading

External links
 Yamachan Land (Japanese) — Japanese chart archives of selected best-selling artists (last updated December 2007)

Best-selling artists
Japan